Lycophotia is a genus of moths of the family Noctuidae.

Selected species
 Lycophotia cissigma (Ménétriés, 1859)
 Lycophotia erythrina (Herrich-Schäffer, [1852])
 Lycophotia molothina (Esper, 1789)
 Lycophotia phyllophora (Grote, 1874)
 Lycophotia porphyrea - True lover's knot ([Schiffermüller], 1775)
 Lycophotia velata (Staudinger, 1888)

References
Natural History Museum Lepidoptera genus database
Lycophotia at funet

 
Noctuoidea genera